Bedhampton railway station serves the former village of Bedhampton, now a suburb lying a mile west of the centre of Havant, in Hampshire, England.

History
Opened in 1906 as "Bedhampton Halt", the station was at first staffed separately but in the late 1940s it came under the control of Havant; since then it has been staffed only part time.
 
In August 2007 the old platform surfaces were resurfaced, new shelters and a railway crossing were added, and Platform 1 (Havant bound) was extended to make it suitable for longer trains.

Facilities
The station has a ticket office on the Portsmouth bound platform which is staffed during weekday and Saturday mornings. At other, the station is unstaffed and tickets can be purchased from the self-service ticket machine at the station.

Both platforms are fitted with shelters and modern help points and  there is also bicycle storage available at the station. Step-free access is available to both platforms at the station.

Services

The typical off-peak service in trains per hour is:
 1 tph to  via 
 1 tph to 
 2 tph to 

Bus Connections
The station is served by the Stagecoach South route 23 which provides regular connections to Leigh Park, Havant, Portsmouth and Southsea.

Gallery

References

External links

Bedhampton
Railway stations in Hampshire
DfT Category E stations
Former London, Brighton and South Coast Railway stations
Railway stations in Great Britain opened in 1906
Railway stations served by Govia Thameslink Railway
Railway stations served by South Western Railway